Hana Antunovic is a Swedish karateka. She won one of the bronze medals in the women's kumite +68 kg event at the 2018 World Karate Championships held in Madrid, Spain.

In 2015, she lost her bronze medal match in the women's kumite +68 kg event at the European Games held in Baku, Azerbaijan. She also competed in the women's kumite +68 kg at the 2019 European Games held in Minsk, Belarus. She lost all three matches in the elimination round and she did not advance to compete in the semi-finals.

In 2021, she competed at the World Olympic Qualification Tournament held in Paris, France hoping to qualify for the 2020 Summer Olympics in Tokyo, Japan. She was eliminated in her first match.

Achievements

References 

Living people
Year of birth missing (living people)
Place of birth missing (living people)
Swedish female karateka
European Games competitors for Sweden
Karateka at the 2015 European Games
Karateka at the 2019 European Games
21st-century Swedish women